Harry Herchel Adler (born 21 September 1928) is a Brazilian former sailor who competed in the 1964 Summer Olympics in the Star class. One year prior, he won a bronze in the 1963 Pan American Games. He was born in Salvador, Bahia. His sons Daniel Adler and Alan Adler also sailed in the Olympics.

References

1928 births
Living people
Brazilian male sailors (sport)
Olympic sailors of Brazil
Sailors at the 1964 Summer Olympics – Star
Sportspeople from Salvador, Bahia
Medalists at the 1963 Pan American Games
Sailors at the 1963 Pan American Games
Pan American Games medalists in sailing
Pan American Games bronze medalists for Brazil
20th-century Brazilian people
21st-century Brazilian people